Morgan Creek is a  long 4th order tributary to the New Hope River in North Carolina.  Morgan Creek forms the New Hope River along with New Hope Creek within the B. Everett Jordan Lake Reservoir.

Course
Morgan Creek rises in a pond on the Cane Creek and New Hope Creek divide about 0.5 miles northeast of Dodsons Crossroads, North Carolina. It flows into University Lake in Chapel Hill and then Morgan Creek flows southeast to meet New Hope Creek and forms the New Hope River in the B. Everett Jordan Lake Reservoir in Chatham County.

Watershed
Morgan Creek drains  of area, receives about 47.5 in/year of precipitation, has a topographic wetness index of 433.06, and has an average water temperature of 14.91 °C.  The watershed is 61% forested.

Angling 
Morgan Creek is open to fishing, in the creek you can find Largemouth Bass, Sunfish, Black Bullhead Catfish, Yellow Bullhead Catfish, Brown Bullhead Catfish, Channel Catfish, Common Carp and most likely fish that are not known about being in Morgan Creek, you need a North Carolina fishing license to fish there unless you are under the age of 16 or you fish on the 4th of July when everyone is exempt.

References

Rivers of North Carolina
Rivers of Chatham County, North Carolina
Rivers of Durham County, North Carolina
Rivers of Orange County, North Carolina